The Fifty-Two Library was a series of children's adventure stories published by Hutchinson & Co., London between the late nineteenth century and the early twentieth century, and later republished by D. Appleton & Co., New York.

The editor of the series was Alfred Henry Miles (1848–1929) and he compiled some fifty volumes that appeared at five shillings apiece. Miles was a prolific Victorian era author, editor, anthologist, journalist, composer and lecturer who arranged and edited hundreds of works on a wide range of topics.

Books
 Fifty-Two Stories for Boys (1889)
 Fifty-Two Stories for Girls (1889)
 Fifty-Two More Stories for Boys (1890)
 Fifty-Two More Stories for Girls (1890)
 Fifty-Two Further Stories for Boys (1891)
 Fifty-Two Further Stories for Girls (1891) with Rosa M. Gilbert
 Fifty-Two Other Stories for Boys (1892)
 Fifty-Two Other Stories for Girls (1892)
 Fifty-Two Fairy Tales (1892)
 Fifty-Two Stories for Boyhood and Youth (1893)
 Fifty-Two Stories for Girlhood and Youth (1893)
 Fifty-Two Stories for Children (1893)
 Fifty-Two Stories of Boy-Life at Home and Abroad (1894)
 Fifty-Two Stories of Girl-Life at Home and Abroad (1894) with Rosa M. Gilbert
 Fifty-Two Stories of Life and Adventure for Boys (1895)
 Fifty-Two Stories of Life and Adventure for Girls (1895)
 Fifty-Two Stories of the Indian Mutiny (1895) with Arthur John Pattle
 Fifty-Two Stories of Pluck and Peril for Boys (1896)
 Fifty-Two Stories of Pluck and Peril and Romance for Girls (1896)
 Fifty-Two Stories of the British Navy, from Damme to Trafalgar (1896)
 Fifty-Two Stories of Duty and Daring for Boys (1897)
 Fifty-Two Stories of Duty and Daring for Girls (1897)
 Fifty-Two Stories of the British Army (1897, 1915)
 Fifty-Two Holiday Stories for Boys (1898)
 Fifty-Two Holiday Stories for Girls (1898)
 Fifty-Two Sunday Stories for Boys and Girls (1898)
 Fifty-Two Stories of Heroism in Life and Action for Boys (1899)
 Fifty-Two Stories of Heroism in Life and Action for Girls (1899)
 Fifty-Two Stories of the Wide, Wide World (1899)
 Fifty-Two Stirring Stories for Boys (1900)
 Fifty-Two Stirring Stories for Girls (1900)
 Fifty-Two Stories of the British Empire (1900, 1917)
 Fifty-Two Stories of Courage and Endeavour for Boys (1901)
 Fifty-Two Stories of Courage and Endeavour for Girls (1901)
 Fifty-Two Stories of Greater Britain (1901)
 Fifty-Two Stories of the Brave and True for Boys (1902)
 Fifty-Two Stories of the Brave and True for Girls (1902)
 Fifty-Two Stories for the Little Ones (1902)
 Fifty-Two Stories of School Life and After for Boys (1903)
 Fifty-Two Stories of School Life and After for Girls (1903)
 Fifty-Two Stories of Animal Life and Adventure (1903)
 Fifty-Two Stories of Grit and Character for Boys (1904)
 Fifty-Two Stories of Grit and Character for Girls (1904)
 Fifty-Two Stories of Wild Life East and West (1904)
 Fifty-Two Stories of Head, Heart, and Hand for Boys (1905)
 Fifty-Two Stories of Head, Heart, and Hand for Girls (1905)
 Fifty-Two Thrilling Stories of Life at Home and Abroad (1905)
 Fifty-Two New Stories for Boys (1906)
 Fifty-Two New Stories for Girls (1906)
 Fifty-Two Pioneer Stories All Round the Compass (1906)
 Fifty-Two Excelsior Stories for Boys (1907)
 Fifty-Two Excelsior Stories for Girls (1907)

References

External links
Fifty-Two Stories For Girls at Project Gutenberg
Fifty-Two Stories of the British Navy at Project Gutenberg

Series of children's books
19th-century British children's literature
20th-century British children's literature
Children's short story collections